Alexander Frolov may refer to:
Alexander Frolov (August 21, 1902 (September 2, 1902)NS–August 9, 1952), Soviet rear admiral and Chief of Staff of the Soviet Pacific Fleet in World War II
Aleksandr Frolov (businessman) (born 1964), Russian businessman
Alexander Frolov (born 1982), Russian ice hockey player